Oskars Muižnieks (born 9 December 1989) is a Latvian biathlete and mountain biker. He competed in the 2018 Winter Olympics.

References

1989 births
Living people
Biathletes at the 2018 Winter Olympics
Latvian male biathletes
Olympic biathletes of Latvia
Latvian male cross-country skiers
People from Jūrmala